Dry Lakes Plateau is a  historic district including 65 archeological sites, in the Bodie Hills, California area.  The district was listed on the National Register of Historic Places in 2002 for its potential to yield information in the future.

See also
Aurora Fire

References 

Archaeological sites on the National Register of Historic Places in California
History of Mono County, California
Historic districts on the National Register of Historic Places in California
National Register of Historic Places in Mono County, California